The 2021 KBS Drama Awards, presented by Korean Broadcasting System (KBS), was held on December 31, 2021, at KBS Hall in Yeouido, Seoul. It was hosted by Lee Do-hyun, Kim So-hyun and Sung Si-kyung. Grand Prize (Daesang) was awarded to Ji Hyun-woo.

Winners and nominees
Winners will be listed first and emphasized in bold.

Presenters

Special performances

See also
 2021 SBS Drama Awards
 2021 MBC Drama Awards

References

External links 
  
 

Korean Broadcasting System original programming
2021 television awards
KBS Drama Awards
December 2021 events in South Korea
2021 in South Korean television